Pakarnnattam  is a 2012 Malayalam film directed by Jayaraj, starring Jayaram and Jayaraj's wife Sabitha Jayaraj in the lead roles. The film is based on political violences and fight against Endosulfan menace in Kasargod, Kerala.

Plot
The film explores the practice that makes martyrs of the local political activists who are willing to sacrifice their life for ideologies. The film is also a poignant love story of a Meera (Sabitha Jayaraj) and  her relentless fight against her own family and society for the man she love. Meera falls in love with Thomas (Jayaram), who becomes an accused in a political murder and is sent to jail. Although Thomas is innocent, he accepts the verdict against him for his political party. Along with Meera's battle to save Thomas, the film also makes a statement on the tragedy caused by the pesticide Endosulfan, in Kasaragod district. Thomas is an activist who fights for the rights of the victims of Endosulfan.

Cast
 Jayaram as Thomas
 Sabitha Jayaraj as Meera
 Bhasi Thiruvalla as Adv. Kaimal
 Vijay Victor as Sudhi
 Satish Poduval as Raghavan
 Nedumbram Gopi as Meera's father
 Madampu Kunjukuttan as Meera's uncle
 Vijayan Peringode as Meera's uncle
 Eliamma as Thomas's mother

Accolades
Pakarnnattam was screened in the Malayalam Cinema Today section in the 16th International Film Festival of Kerala (IFFK), 2011.

References

2010s Malayalam-language films
Environmental films
Films about communism
Indian political films